Common names: Kenyan carpet viper, Leakey's saw-scaled viper.

Echis pyramidum leakeyi is a venomous viper subspecies endemic to northern East Africa.

Etymology
The specific name, leakeyi, is in honor of Kenyan herpetologist J.H.E. Leakey.

Geographic range
Echis pyramidum leakeyi is found in southwestern Ethiopia (Lake Stephanie), northwestern Kenya, and southern Somalia.

The type locality is "Nord-Kenya, West-Ufer des Baringo-Sees, Campi ya Samaki, ca. 1000 m. H" (= North Kenya, west bank of Lake Baringo, Camp ya Samaka, ca. 3,300 ft).

References

Further reading
 Golay P, Smith HM, Broadley DG, Dixon JR, McCarthy CJ, Rage J-C, Schätti B, Toriba M. 1993. Endoglyphs and Other Major Venomous Snakes of the World. A Checklist. Geneva: Azemiops Herpetological Data Center. 478 pp.
 Stemmler O, Sochurek E. 1969. Die Sandrasselotter von Kenya: Echis carinatus leakeyi subsp. nov. Aquaterra 6 (8): 89-94.

External links
 
 

Viperinae
Reptiles of Ethiopia
Reptiles of Kenya
Reptiles of Somalia